Mark Harris (born November 25, 1963) is an American journalist and author. He began his career at Entertainment Weekly, where he started as a columnist and eventually became the magazine's executive editor. His writing has also appeared at Slate and New York magazine. 

Harris has written three books relating to American film history. His first book, Pictures at a Revolution: Five Movies and the Birth of the New Hollywood, about changes in Hollywood in the 1960s and the rise of the New Hollywood movement, was published in 2008. His second book, Five Came Back: A Story of Hollywood and the Second World War, examined five American directors who made films for the U.S. military during World War II; it was released in 2014 and later adapted into a 2017 Netflix documentary series of the same name. His third book, Mike Nichols: A Life, a biography about the filmmaker, was published in 2021.

Career
After graduating from Yale University in 1985, Harris worked at Entertainment Weekly. He began as a columnist and later became executive editor of the magazine.
Since 2008, Harris has written and released three books. His first book, Pictures at a Revolution: Five Movies and the Birth of the New Hollywood, an examination of how the American film industry changed during the 1960s, was published in February 2008. Writing in The New York Times Book Review, author Jim Shepard called the book "full of pleasures ... He seems to have talked to virtually everyone who’s still around, and to great effect ... Mark Harris's legwork and intelligence transport us gratefully back to that exhilarating moment when it was all still about to occur."

In February 2014, Harris published his second book, Five Came Back: A Story of Hollywood and the Second World War. The work is an examination of five U.S. film directors—John Ford, William Wyler, John Huston, Frank Capra, George Stevens—and their frontline work during the World War II. The book was well received, with The New York Times calling it, "a tough-minded, information-packed and irresistibly readable work", and The Washington Post writing that the book "has all the elements of a good movie: fascinating characters, challenges, conflicts and intense action." The trade publication Booklist wrote, "It's hardly news that the movies affect and are affected by the broader canvas of popular culture and world history, but Harris – perhaps more successfully than any other writer, past or present – manages to find in that symbiotic relationship the stuff of great stories," calling the book, "narrative nonfiction that is as gloriously readable as it is unfailingly informative." In 2017, the book was adapted into a three-part Netflix documentary series Five Came Back.

His third book, Mike Nichols: A Life, was published in February 2021 to critical acclaim.

, Harris is a columnist and feature writer for New York magazine.

Personal life
Harris is married to playwright Tony Kushner. In attendance at the couple's May 2003 commitment ceremony were director George C. Wolfe, playwright Larry Kramer, Mike Nichols and Diane Sawyer, actresses Linda Emond and Kathleen Chalfant, and, The New York Times reported, "dozens of aunts, uncles, nieces and nephews, many of them crying."  Theirs was the first same-sex commitment ceremony to be featured in the Vows column of The New York Times. , they live in New York City and Provincetown, Massachusetts.

In the summer of 2008 (after Massachusetts had legalized same-sex marriage in 2004, but before New York or the U.S. Supreme Court had done so), they were legally married at the city hall in Provincetown.

Bibliography

References

External links
 Mark Harris at Slate
 
 
 2012 interview at TheLipTV
 Mark Harris at New York magazine
 Mark Harris at Entertainment Weekly
 Weddings: Mark Harris and Tony Kushner in The New York Times
 The New Art of Coming Out in Hollywood at Entertainment Weekly
 Five Came Back: A Story of Hollywood and the Second World War review at The New York Times

1963 births
20th-century American journalists
20th-century American male writers
21st-century American biographers
21st-century American journalists
21st-century American male writers
American film historians
American magazine editors
American male journalists
Historians from New York (state)
American LGBT journalists
LGBT people from New York (state)
Living people
New York (magazine) people
People from Provincetown, Massachusetts
Place of birth missing (living people)
Slate (magazine) people
Writers from Manhattan
Yale College alumni